ANIH Berhad is the second largest Highway Concessionarie (by distance of highways operated) in Malaysia after PLUS Expressways. ANIH Berhad is a member company of MTD Group.

History
ANIH Berhad was founded on 7 April 2011 after officially taken over the operations of Toll Concession from MTD Prime Sdn Bhd and Metramac Corporation Sdn Bhd who respectively owned the concessions for Kuala Lumpur–Karak Expressway , East Coast Expressway Phase 1 , and Kuala Lumpur–Seremban Expressway  (including East–West Link Expressway) with effect from 6 December 2011.

List of expressways maintained by ANIH Berhad

Highway patrols of ANIH Berhad

LPT Ronda
LPT Ronda is the highway patrol unit for the East Coast Expressway.

Scope of work
 Provides 24-hour assistance to breakdown and accident vehicles.
 Provide towing services to the nearest safe place.
 Report traffic flow.
 Assist authorities during emergency
 Monitor and inspect facilities condition at laybys and rest and service areas.

Current inventory

See also 
 PROPEL
 PLUS Expressways
 Litrak
 Teras Teknologi (TERAS)
 Malaysian expressway system
 Transport in Malaysia
 List of toll roads

External links
 ANIH Berhad website

Expressways company of Malaysia
2011 establishments in Malaysia
Companies established in 2011
Privately held companies of Malaysia